The Minister of Health, Well-being and Sport is the head of the Ministry of Health, Welfare and Sport and a member of the Cabinet and the Council of Ministers. The incumbent minister is Ernst Kuipers of the Democrats 66 (D66) party who has been in office since 10 January 2022. Regularly a State Secretary is assigned to the Ministry who is tasked with specific portfolios. The current State Secretary is Maarten van Ooijen of the Christian Union (CU) party who also has been in office since 10 January 2022 and has been assigned the portfolios of Youth Care and Preventive Care. Occasionally there is also a Minister without Portfolio assigned to the Ministry who is also giving specific portfolios. The current Minister without Portfolio is Conny Helder of the People's Party for Freedom and Democracy (VVD) and who also has been in office since 10 January 2022 and has been assigned the portfolios of Primary Healthcare, Long-term care and Sport.

List of Ministers of Health

List of Ministers without Portfolio

List of State Secretaries for Health

See also
 Ministry of Health, Welfare and Sport

References

Health